Rockville Chautauqua Pavilion, also known as Beechwood Park Pavilion, is a historic Chautauqua pavilion located at Rockville, Parke County, Indiana.  The pavilion was built in 1913, and is a roughly octagonal heavy timber-frame building.  It has a raised -story, clerestory square section with a decked hipped roof.  Also on the property are the contributing park entry gates (1928), a picnic shelter, and a water fountain.  The property hosted annual summer chautauquas from 1913 to 1930.

It was listed on the National Register of Historic Places in 1999.

References

Chautauqua
Event venues on the National Register of Historic Places in Indiana
Buildings and structures completed in 1913
Buildings and structures in Parke County, Indiana
National Register of Historic Places in Parke County, Indiana